Valasapakala is situated in East Godavari district in Kakinada, in Andhra Pradesh State.

References

Villages in East Godavari district